Ravindu Tillakaratne (born 9 September 1996) is a Sri Lankan cricketer. He made his first-class debut for Nondescripts Cricket Club in the 2016–17 Premier League Tournament on 11 January 2017. He made his Twenty20 debut for Kalutara Town Club in the 2017–18 SLC Twenty20 Tournament on 1 March 2018. He made his List A debut for Kalutara Town Club in the 2017–18 Premier Limited Overs Tournament on 12 March 2018.

He is the son of Sri Lankan Test cricketer Hashan Tillakaratne, and the twin brother of Duvindu Tillakaratne.

References

External links
 

1996 births
Living people
Sri Lankan cricketers
Kalutara Town Club cricketers
Nondescripts Cricket Club cricketers
Cricketers from Colombo